The Tour des Aéroports was a cycling race held annually in Tunisia. It was part of UCI Africa Tour in category 2.2 in 2006 and 2007.

Winners

References

Cycle races in Tunisia
Recurring sporting events established in 1997
Recurring sporting events disestablished in 2010
UCI Africa Tour races
Defunct cycling races in Tunisia